ScreenPlay is a studio album by Tierney Sutton, released on May 17, 2019. The album received a Grammy Award nomination for Best Jazz Vocal Album.

Track listing
 "The Windmills of Your Mind" – 5:31
 "Moon River / Calling You" – 4:40
 "On a Clear Day (You Can See Forever)" – 4:05
 "What Are You Doing the Rest of Your Life?" (featuring Christian Jacob) – 5:48
 "I've Got No Strings" (featuring Serge Merlaud) – 4:29
 "If I Only Had a Brain" (featuring Kevin Axt & Trey Henry) – 5:59
 "The Sound of Silence" – 5:31
 "Goodbye for Now" (featuring Kevin Axt & Trey Henry) – 2:27
 "Diamonds Are a Girl's Best Friend" (featuring Ray Brinker) – 3:23
 "Hopelessly Devoted to You" (featuring Christian Jacob) – 4:11
 "You're the One That I Want" – 5:01
 "How Do You Keep the Music Playing?" (featuring Alan Bergman) – 4:20
 "Ev'ry Now and Then" (featuring Christian Jacob) – 2:58
 "It Might Be You" (feat. Serge Merlaud) – 6:24
 "Arrow" – 2:55

References

2019 albums
Tierney Sutton albums